The 2015 Lichfield District Council election took place on 7 May 2015 to elect members of the Lichfield District Council in England. It was held on the same day as other local elections.

Election result
The Conservatives maintained control of the council.

References

2015 English local elections
May 2015 events in the United Kingdom
2015
2010s in Staffordshire